Galactosamine is a hexosamine derived from galactose with the molecular formula C6H13NO5.  This amino sugar is a constituent of some glycoprotein hormones such as follicle-stimulating hormone (FSH) and luteinizing hormone (LH).

Precursors such as uridine diphosphate (UDP), UDP-N-acetyl-D-glucosamine, or glucosamine are used to synthesize galactosamine in the human body. A derivative of this compound is N-acetyl-D-galactosamine.

Galactosamine is a hepatotoxic, or liver-damaging, agent that is sometimes used in animal models of liver failure.

Hepatotoxicity 
Galactosamine is used to induce hepatitis in rodent liver for research purposes. The result of using galactosamine to induce hepatitis is a disease model in which there is necrosis and inflammation of the liver. This type of tissue damage triggered by galactosamine resembles drug-induced liver disease in humans.

Mechanism of hepatotoxicity 
The proposed mechanism behind galactosamine-induced hepatitis is depletion of the energy source of hepatocytes. In the Leloir pathway galactosamine is metabolized into galactosamine-1-phosphate (by galactokinase) and UDP-galactosamine (by UDP-galactose uridyltransferase). It is hypothesized that this leads to UDP-galactosamine accumulation within cells, and uridine triphosphate (UTP), UDP, and uridine monophosphate (UMP) decrease. The depletion of high-energy molecules such as UTP leads to a disruption in hepatocyte metabolism. Additionally, other derivatives of uridine such as UDP-glucose are depleted and this interferes with glycogen synthesis in the cell.

Another recent hypothesis states that overexpression of pro-inflammatory cytokines (such as tumor necrosis factor (TNFα) and NFκB-dependent inducible nitric oxide synthase (iNOS) over expression play a role in galactosamine-induced damage to liver cells.

See also
 N-Acetylgalactosamine 
 Uridine

References

External links
 

Hexosamines